The Storžič Lodge is a mountain hostel in the upper part of the Lomščica Valley, near the Jesenje Pasture in northwestern Slovenia. The first lodge was built in 1938 and was called the Verbič Lodge; it caught fire one year later. It burned in 1941 when German forces attacked the Storžič Battalion. The current brown shingled hut was built in 1951.

Access 
 3h: from the town of Tržič through the village of Lom pod Storžičem
 3½h: from the Forest Shelter (891 m), via the Little Poljana Pasture (1325 m)
 3½-4h: from Spodnje Jezersko, via the Podstoržec Pasture

Nearby lodges 

 3h: to the Mount Križe Lodge (1471 m), via Fat Peak (1715 m), via the Slovenian Mountain Hiking Trail
 2½h: to the Kališče Lodge (1534 m), via the Javornik Pass and the Bašelj Pass

Nearby mountains 
 3h: Stegovnik (1692 m), via Mount Javornik
 3½h: Storžič (2132 m), via the Psice Ridge
 3½h: Storžič (2132 m), via Škar Crag, on the Slovenian Mountain Hiking Trail
 3h: Storžič (2132 m), via the Žrelo Gorge

References 
 Slovenska planinska pot, Planinski vodnik, PZS, 2012, Milenko Arnejšek - Prle, Andraž Poljanec

External links 
 Routes, Description & Photos
 Dom pod Storžičem (slo)

Kamnik–Savinja Alps
Mountain huts in Slovenia